Bathyphlebia johnsoni is a moth in the family Saturniidae. It is found in Peru.

The length of the forewings is 58 mm for males and 64 mm for females. Males have cinnamon brown wings with a yellow spot basad of the eye spot of the forewings. The apical area of the forewings is yellow, and the outer margin of the forewings is concave. Females have a distinct eye spot on the forewings with a white center and a brown iris margined externally with black.

Subspecies
Bathyphlebia johnsoni johnsoni
Bathyphlebia johnsoni flavior Oiticica Filho & Michener, 1950 (Peru)

References

Ceratocampinae
Moths described in 1950